Fabio Tito (born 10 July 1993) is an Italian professional footballer who plays as a defender for  club Avellino.

References

External links 
 
 
 

1993 births
Living people
People from Castellammare di Stabia
Footballers from Campania
Italian footballers
Association football defenders
Serie C players
Serie D players
S.S. Scafatese Calcio 1922 players
S.S. Ischia Isolaverde players
Casertana F.C. players
Benevento Calcio players
Calcio Foggia 1920 players
S.S. Fidelis Andria 1928 players
Modena F.C. 2018 players
U.S. Vibonese Calcio players
U.S. Avellino 1912 players